Samuel Glenn "Tiny" Hartranft (December 3, 1901 – August 12, 1970) was an American athlete. He competed in the shot put and discus throw at the 1924 Summer Olympics and won a silver medal in the shot put, placing sixth in the discus. He won the IC4A championships in both events in 1922 and 1924. In 1924 he set a world record in the discus, which was not ratified because of high wind. He set an official world record next year at 47.89 m.

Hartranft was head football coach at San Jose State University in 1942 and the school's head baseball coach from 1944 to 1945.

Head coaching record

Football

References

External links
 

1901 births
1970 deaths
American male discus throwers
American male shot putters
Athletes (track and field) at the 1924 Summer Olympics
Medalists at the 1924 Summer Olympics
Olympic silver medalists for the United States in track and field
San Jose State Spartans athletic directors
San Jose State Spartans baseball coaches
San Jose State Spartans football coaches
Stanford Cardinal men's track and field athletes
Track and field athletes from California
Track and field athletes from San Jose, California